The Ambassador Extraordinary and Plenipotentiary of Ukraine to the Holy See and the Sovereign Military Order of Malta is the ambassador of Ukraine to the Holy See (as well as the Sovereign Military Order of Malta). Since April 2022 the current ambassador is Andrii Yurash who succeeds Tetyana Yizhevska, who assumed the position in 2007; she assumed the position of ambassador to the Order of Malta in 2009.

The first Ukrainian ambassador to the Holy See assumed his post in 2000, the same year a Ukrainian embassy opened in the Vatican.

List of representatives

Ukrainian People's Republic
 1919–1919 Mykhailo Tyshkevych
 1919–1921 Franz Xavier Bonne

Ukraine
 1999–2003 Nina Kovalska
 2004–2006 Hryhoriy Khoruzhyi
 2007–2022 Tetyana Yizhevska
 2022–present Andrii Yurash

See also 
 Ukrainian Embassy, Vatican
 Holy See Ambassador to Ukraine

References

External links 
  Embassy of Ukraine to the Holy See: Previous Ambassadors

Ambassadors of Ukraine to the Holy See
Holy See
Ukraine